This is a list of the buildings, sites, districts, and objects listed on the National Register of Historic Places in the Marshall Islands. There are currently 4 listed sites located in only three of the 24 atolls that make up the Marshall Islands.

Listings 

|}

See also
List of United States National Historic Landmarks in United States commonwealths and territories, associated states, and foreign states

References

External links

National Park Service, National Register of Historic Places Program